These are the full results of the athletics competition at the 2006 South American Games also serving as the 2006 South American Under-23 Championships in Athletics. The event took place between November 10 and November 12, 2006 at Centro Nacional de Alto Rendimiento Deportivo (CeNARD) in Buenos Aires, Argentina.

Men's results

100 meters

Heat 1 – 10 November 17:10h - Wind: +0.9 m/s

Heat 2 – 10 November 17:10h - Wind: +1.0 m/s

Final – 10 November 19:10h - Wind: +0.9 m/s

200 meters

Heat 1 – 12 November 10:35h - Wind: +2.5 m/s

Heat 2 – 12 November 10:35h - Wind: +2.0 m/s

Final – 12 November 17:55h - Wind: +2.3 m/s

400 meters

Heat 1 – 10 November 10:30h

Heat 2 – 10 November 10:30h

Final – 10 November 18:40h

800 meters
Final – 10 November 18:20h

1500 meters
Final – 11 November 18:10h

5000 meters
Final – 10 November 19:30h

10,000 meters
Final – 12 November 18:50h

3000 meters steeplechase
Final – 12 November 17:10h

110 meters hurdles
Final – 10 November 16:35h - Wind: +2.6 m/s

400 meters hurdles

Heat 1 – 11 November 10:20h

Heat 2 – 11 November 10:20h

Final – 11 November 19:00h

High jump
Final – 11 November 16:10h

Note: The number of missed jumps at intermediate heights appears to be incomplete.

Pole vault
Final – 12 November 16:40h

Long jump
Final – 10 November 17:35h

Triple jump
Final – 11 November 19:35h

Shot put
Final – 10 November 16:15h

Discus throw
Final – 12 November 18:15h

Hammer throw
Final – 10 November 15:00h

Javelin throw
Final – 11 November 19:30h

Decathlon
Final – 11 November 20:20h

20 kilometers walk
Final – 11 November 7:30h

4x100 meters relay
Final – 10 November 20:30h

4x400 meters relay
Final – 12 November 20:20h

Women's results

100 meters

Heat 1 – 10 November 16:50h - Wind: +3.0 m/s

Heat 2 – 10 November 16:50h - Wind: +3.3 m/s

Final – 10 November 19:00h - Wind: +1.9 m/s

200 meters

Heat 1 – 12 November 10:20h - Wind: +1.9 m/s

Heat 2 – 12 November 10:20h - Wind: +1.2 m/s

Final – 12 November 17:40h - Wind: +1.7 m/s

400 meters
Final – 10 November 18:30h

800 meters
Final – 10 November 18:10h

1500 meters
Final – 11 November 17:50h

5000 meters
Final – 10 November 17:30h

10,000 meters
Final – 11 November 19:20h

3000 meters steeplechase
Final – 12 November 16:30h

100 meters hurdles
Final – 10 November 16:20h - Wind: +1.9 m/s

400 meters hurdles
Final – 11 November 10:00h

High jump
Final – 12 November 16:10h

Pole vault
Final – 10 November 17:00h

Long jump
Final – 10 November 10:30h

Triple jump
Final – 11 November 18:15h

Shot put
Final – 11 November 19:00h

Discus throw
Final – 12 November 17:00h

Hammer throw
Final – 10 November 18:55h

Javelin throw
Final – 11 November 16:20h

Heptathlon
Final – 12 November 20:00h

20 kilometers walk
Final – 11 November 7:30h

4x100 meters relay
Final – 10 November 20:30h

4x400 meters relay
Final – 12 November 20:00h

Note
The names of the Brazilian athletes were completed using the published list of participants.

References

2006
2006
South American Games
2006 in youth sport
Athl